Chal Gurab or Chal-e Gurab may refer to:
 Chal Gurab, Lali